Lineodes longipes is a moth in the family Crambidae. It was described by Sepp in 1852. It is found on Sumatra.

References

Moths described in 1852
Spilomelinae